The  is a concrete gravity dam on the Kanna River in Ginoza, Okinawa Prefecture, Japan. The purpose of the dam is water supply and flood control. After studies were carried out in the 1970s(starting in 1973 and ending in 1978), construction on the dam began in 1982 and it was completed in 1992. A fish ladder was installed on the dam during construction to assist the migration of fish, shrimp and crabs. Mangroves downstream of the dam were restored after construction and the area is a tourist destination along with a habitat for water fowl.

References

Dams in Okinawa Prefecture
Gravity dams
Dams completed in 1992
Dams with fish ladders